Shishir Anil Bhavane (born 24 September 1991) is an Indian cricketer who plays for Karnataka cricket team. He bats left-handed and bowls right-arm off break. He was bought by Royal Challengers Bangalore at the 2015 IPL auction for his base price of Rs.10 lakh.

Career
Between 2005/06 and 2014/15, Bhavane played for various age-group teams of Karnataka including Under-15s, Under-17s, Under-19s, Under-22s, Under-23s and Under-25s.

Bhavane played for the Mysore Warriors in the 2014-15 Karnataka Premier League in which he scored 307 runs at an average of 76.50 and won the man of the tournament award. He was picked in the Karnataka squad for the 2014–15 Vijay Hazare Trophy in November 2014 when he made his senior cricket debut. In his second match of the tournament, he scored an unbeaten 81 off 76 balls to guide Karnataka's run-chase of 296 against Hyderabad. He made his first-class debut against Mumbai in February 2015 and scored 62 on a turning wicket in Mumbai. Later that month, the Indian Premier League franchise Royal Challengers Bangalore signed him up for his base price of Rs.10 lakh, making him the only Karnataka player in their squad for the 2015 season.

He made his Twenty20 debut for Karnataka in the 2016–17 Inter State Twenty-20 Tournament on 31 January 2017.

References

External links 
 
 

1991 births
Living people
Indian cricketers
Karnataka cricketers
Royal Challengers Bangalore cricketers
People from Hubli
Cricketers from Karnataka